Ballintober is a village in County Roscommon, Ireland. It is 6 kilometers from the town of Castlerea. As of the 2016 census, Ballintober had a population of 300 people.

On the outskirts of the village are the remains of an early 14th century stone castle first mentioned in writing in 1311. It is not recorded who built Ballintober Castle, but it is generally associated with the O'Conor family who ruled Connaught for several centuries.

See also
 List of towns and villages in Ireland

References

Towns and villages in County Roscommon
Civil parishes of County Roscommon